Rick Rootlieb is a Dutch mixed martial artist.

Mixed martial arts record

|-
| Loss
| align=center| 3-6
| Patrick de Witte
| KO (head kick)
| It's Showtime: Christmas Edition
| 
| align=center| 1
| align=center| 0:06
| Haarlem, North Holland, Netherlands
| 
|-
| Loss
| align=center| 3-5
| Amar Suloev
| Submission (choke)
| M-1 MFC: World Championship 2000
| 
| align=center| 0
| align=center| 0:00
| Saint Petersburg, Russia
| 
|-
| Loss
| align=center| 3-4
| Fred van Doesburg
| Submission (smother)
| Rings Holland: Di Capo Di Tutti Capi
| 
| align=center| 1
| align=center| 4:18
| Utrecht, Netherlands
| 
|-
| Loss
| align=center| 3-3
| Richard Plug
| Submission (smother)
| Rings Holland: The Kings of the Magic Ring
| 
| align=center| 2
| align=center| 2:22
| Utrecht, Netherlands
| 
|-
| Loss
| align=center| 3-2
| Artur Mariano
| Submission
| Gym Alkmaar: Fight Gala
| 
| align=center| 0
| align=center| 0:00
| Schermerhorn, North Holland, Netherlands
| 
|-
| Win
| align=center| 3-1
| Adrian Wild
| Submission (kneebar)
| Rings Holland: Judgement Day
| 
| align=center| 1
| align=center| 1:55
| Amsterdam, North Holland, Netherlands
| 
|-
| Win
| align=center| 2-1
| Johan Woudstra
| KO
| Rings Holland: The Thialf Explosion
| 
| align=center| 0
| align=center| 0:00
| Heerenveen
| 
|-
| Loss
| align=center| 1-1
| Dennis Deryabkin
| KO
| M-1 MFC: World Championship 1998
| 
| align=center| 1
| align=center| 9:45
| Saint Petersburg, Russia
| 
|-
| Win
| align=center| 1-0
| Vyacheslav Kiselev
| TKO
| M-1 MFC: World Championship 1998
| 
| align=center| 1
| align=center| 1:40
| Saint Petersburg, Russia
|

See also
List of male mixed martial artists

References

Living people
Dutch male mixed martial artists
Year of birth missing (living people)
Place of birth missing (living people)
Sportspeople from Alkmaar